Daudnagar is a town and the subdivisional headquarter of Daudnagar Subdivision in Aurangabad district in the state of Bihar, India under the Magadh division. Until 1991, there was only one Subdivision in the Aurangabad district: Aurangabad Sadar. On 31 March 1991, one other subdivision, Daudnagar, was created. Daudnagar is a 200-year-old historical city and its living proof is Daudnagar has an old historical fort situated on the eastern bank of the Son River. National Highway NH139 which connects Jharkhand's Palamu district to Patna, passes through the town.

History
Daudnagar was founded by Daud Khan. The area between Daudnagar and Aurangabad assumed great strategic importance when Daud Khan, Aurangzeb's Subedar in Bihar, marched against the Raja of Palamu. As a mark of victory against the Raja in the year 1664, Daud Khan founded the city of Daudnagar. Daud Khan Qureshi was an Indian Muslim Shaikhzada native of Hisar (city) in Haryana, then called Hisar Firuza. The surrounding area was also granted to him as a Jagir by the emperor. Early in the 18th century, Buchanan saw it as a flourishing town with cloth and opium factories. The Sarai, built by Daud Khan was possibly intended to serve as a stronghold, as it was well-fortified with a battlemented wall, two large gates and a surrounding moat. In the outlying part of the town, called Ahmadganj, lies the tomb of Ahmad Khan.

Geography
It has an average elevation of 84 metres (275 feet).
Daudnagar is situated on the bank of the Son River and NH139 passes through the town.
The Indrapuri Barrage canal also passes through the town.

Demographics

 India census, Daudnagar town has population of 52,364, male population is 27,493 and female population is 24,871. Population of Children with age of 0-6 is 9003 which is 17.19% of total population. Town's Female Sex Ratio is 905 against state average of 918. Moreover Child Sex Ratio in Daudnagar is around 957 compared to Bihar state average of 935. Literacy rate of the town is 67.51% which is higher than the state average of 61.80%. In Daudnagar, Male literacy is around 74.72% while female literacy rate is 59.44%. Hindus are majority in the town with 80.80% of the population while Muslims constitute 18.78% of the town's total population. Followers of the other religions like Christian, Jain, Sikh, Buddhist also live in Daudnagar but their population is minuscule, just 0.42% of the total population. Schedule Caste (SC) constitutes 12.83% while Schedule Tribe (ST) are 0.08% of the total population of Daudnagar.

Economy and Medical Facilities
The 2.9km 4 lane Sone bridge which connects Daudnagar on the southern bank with Nasriganj on the northern bank of the Sone River and is located around 105km southwest of Patna was inaugurated on 16 February 2019, by the then District Magistrate cum Collector of Aurangabad district. 
The Sone Bridge eases traffic and reduces the distance between Rohtas and Gaya by 60km and between Patna and Rohtas by 70km. Traffic coming from the western part of the country and entering Bihar for onward journey to Jharkhand and other eastern states bypass the busy traffic of Patna, saving precious time and fuel. The Son bridge benefits the entire Buddhist circuit as the distance between Kushinagar and Bodhgaya is reduced by 65km providing an alternate route that currently passes through the congested roads of Patna and Gaya.

Festivals
It is one of the cultural towns of Bihar, where Hindu community are in majority followed by Muslim and Christian.
Some of the festivals celebrated by the people are Durga puja, Chhath, Diwali, Holi, jiutiya (Jivitputrika), Raksha Bandhan, Eid, Muharram, Eid ul Zuha Uurush, Sab e Barat, Eid-e-miladul Nabi, and Christmas.
Daudnagar is famous for its unique and grand celebration of the festival of Jiutiya (Jivitputrika) where women keep fast for the longevity of their son. Dring this festival Daudnagarites disguise themselves as God, Godess, demon, King, Queen etc. and roam in the town to showcase their skill. This way of celebrating the jiutiya festival in the town is century long.

Work Profile 
Out of the total population, 16,446 were engaged in work or business activity. Of this 12,146 were males while 4,300 were females. In census survey, a 'worker' is defined as a person who has a business or job or services as a cultivator or in some other capacity in labour activity. Of the total 16446 working population, 72.15% were engaged in main work while 27.85% of the total workers were engaged in marginal work.

Educational Institutions
Daudnagar town, considered as the hub of education, over the years, has constantly been producing state toppers in High School and Senior Secondary school exams conducted by BSEB, Patna and CBSE, New Delhi.

Daudnagar has many government schools, colleges, private institutions & coaching classes. Students from neighbouring districts also  come here for educational purposes. Following is the list of some of the well known govt. and private institutions
Ashok Inter School Daudnagar
Vivekanand Mission School
DAV Public School, Daudnagar
Gyan Ganga Inter School

Transport and Connectivity
Recently built 3km four-lane bridge on the Son river connecting it to Nasriganj reduces the distance between two different towns of Magadh and Shahabad regions of the state. The new road bridge is now considered part of the NH-120.

Buses
The town has regular bus service facilities in all directions to almost all the major cities
It has also daily immediate services by Victa-Summo to reach Gaya and Patna.
Buses for major cities like Ranchi, Jamshedpur, Bokaro and Kolkata are also available.

Local Transport
Auto-Rickshaw, E-Rickshaw and cycle rickshaw moves here generally as local transport in the city.

Railways
The nearest railway station is Anugraha Narayan Road railway station at Howrah-Delhi main line Grand Chord (daily train to reach National Capital New Delhi) near Pawarganj in Aurangabad.

Other Near railway stations are:
Gaya Junction railway station
Patna Junction railway station
Varanasi Junction railway station

Air
Gaya Airport, Bodhgaya, Varanasi and Patna Airport are the nearest airport to the town.

Villages
Daudnagar block contains 60 rural villages, all of which are inhabited:

See also
List of cities in Bihar

References

External links
Aurangabad, Bihar

Cities and towns in Aurangabad district, Bihar